Boneless Fish is a fish-based frozen food brand and grocery product, the process in the production of which was invented by Dairei Corporation (大冷株式会社) of Japan in 1998. It is essentially a fish that has been scaled, gutted and deboned by a skilled worker before being reassembled with a transglutaminase to look like a dressed fish (fish gutted and with its head and fins removed). The fish is then flash-frozen and packaged, remaining uncooked.

It is possible to manufacture a boneless fish with head and fins intact, but it had been found to be impractical.

Purpose 
The Boneless Fish product was initially intended to feed three groups: the elderly, hospital patients, and schoolchildren. It differs from an ordinary frozen fish fillet in that the content of a Boneless Fish pack looks just like a dressed fish. The product is cooked in the same manner as an ordinary fish.

Dairei began to market it to families in 2002. It had been found to be advantageous to consumers in that aside from being easy to prepare, cooking the brand's boneless fish at home—as against the usual market fish—generates a very small amount of waste.

Production 
The production of Boneless Fish is labor-intensive. Dairei set up HACCP-certified factories in Thailand, China and Vietnam, where its workers cut open the fish and use a pair of tweezers to remove the bones. The end product is then examined to make sure that it is free of bones and then "glued back together" using a food-grade enzyme produced by Ajinomoto.

The Ajinomoto binding agent used in Boneless Fish is a transglutaminase (product name: Activa TG-B) separated from a culture of Streptoverticillium mobaraense. It works by binding the collagen in the fish tissue. At temperatures under 5 °C, it may take several hours for the enzyme to do its job properly.

Similar products 
The popularity of meatless fish inspired another technology-intensive Japanese product, "Fish with Delicious Bones" (骨までおいしい魚; honemade oishii sakana), which has been on sale since 2004. The fish, in the form of a butterfly fillet, is prepared by a patent pending process that uses heat and pressure to tenderize fish bones. The entire fish, including the head and fins, becomes completely edible, much like what happens to canned sardines. It is a joint claimed invention of Maruha Corporation (株式会社マルハ) and Miyajima Soysauce Corporation (宮島醤油株式会社).

Another similar product is "Cold Set Bound Fish Kebabs", made from alternating layers of salmon and cod "glued together" by transglutaminase.

See also

References

External links 
 Boneless Fish Q & A (in Japanese)
 Boneless Fish: A debate (便利？ それともおせっかい？ 賛否両論の「骨なし魚」; in Japanese)
 Ajinomoto: Enzyme for Binder and Texture improver
 Ajinomoto enzyme catalog (in Japanese)
  (filed 1 July 1991, granted 20 October 1992) A transglutaminase catalyzing an acyl transfer reaction of a Γ-carboxyamide group of a glutamine residue in a peptide or protein chain in the absence of Cz2+
  (filed 28 November 1995, granted 19 August 1997) Process for producing bound-formed food by Ajinomoto
  (filed 1 July 1997, granted 19 October 1999) Enzyme preparation for use in the binding of food materials and process for producing bound food

Japanese brand foods
Patented foods
Edible fish
Fish dishes
Products introduced in 1998